Isabel Ferreira (born 24 May 1958, Luanda, Angola) is an Angolan writer. A law graduate, she is known for works such as Laços de Amor (1995), Caminhos Ledos (1997), Nirvana (2004), and Remando Daqui (2005).

Works
Laços de amor: poemas, Lagos, 1995. 
Caminhos Ledos Luanda, Angola: I. Ferreira, 1996. 
Nirvana (2004) 
À Margem das Palavras Nuas (2005) 
Remando Daqui  (2005) 
O guardador de memórias, Edições KujizaKuami, 2007. ,

References

Angolan women writers
1958 births
Living people
Writers from Luanda